Inga megalobotrys is a species of plant in the family Fabaceae. It is found only in Peru.

References

megalobotrys
Flora of Peru
Conservation dependent plants
Taxonomy articles created by Polbot